Samuel Elwood Stith (born July 22, 1937) is an American former professional basketball player. Stith was selected in the 1960 NBA Draft by the Cincinnati Royals after a collegiate career at St. Bonaventure University. He also played in the Eastern Professional Basketball League, where in 1963 he won the league championship.

He is the brother of professional basketball player Tom Stith.

References

1937 births
Living people
Allentown Jets players
American men's basketball players
Basketball players from New York City
Basketball players from Virginia
Cincinnati Royals draft picks
New York Knicks players
Shooting guards
Sportspeople from Queens, New York
St. Bonaventure Bonnies men's basketball players
Wilkes-Barre Barons players